Kym Michelle Howe-Nadin (born 12 June 1980 in Perth, Western Australia) is an Australian athlete competing in the pole vault. She has an indoor personal best of 4.72 metres, achieved in February 2007 in Donetsk.  she has three children oldest one Ava Nadin youngest ones unknown

Achievements

References

1980 births
Living people
Australian female pole vaulters
Athletes (track and field) at the 2002 Commonwealth Games
Athletes (track and field) at the 2006 Commonwealth Games
Athletes (track and field) at the 2004 Summer Olympics
Olympic athletes of Australia
Athletes from Perth, Western Australia
Commonwealth Games gold medallists for Australia
Commonwealth Games medallists in athletics
Medallists at the 2002 Commonwealth Games
Medallists at the 2006 Commonwealth Games